Naviauxella is a genus of beetles in the family Cicindelidae, containing the following species:

 Naviauxella davisona (Gestro, 1889)
 Naviauxella declivitatis Naviaux, 1991
 Naviauxella gabrieli Naviaux, 1991
 Naviauxella pinratanai Naviaux, 1991
 Naviauxella ramai Naviaux, 1991
 Naviauxella recondita Naviaux, 1991
 Naviauxella rufovittata Cassola & Werner, 1995
 Naviauxella snowiana Cassola, 2002
 Naviauxella tenuiformis Naviaux, 1991
 Naviauxella vientianensis Sawada & Wiesner, 1999

References

Cicindelidae